The Venerable Alan Stanley Giles  (28 May 1902 –  26 March 1975) was an eminent Anglican priest in the second half of the 20th century.

He was born into an ecclesiastical family and educated at Manchester Grammar School and The Queen's College, Oxford. He was  ordained in 1932 and began his career as Curate of St Ebbe's, Oxford and Chaplain of Christ Church. From 1934 to 1959 he was an RAF Chaplain, rising through the service to become its Archdeacon (Chaplain-in-Chief) from 1953. He was taken prisoner of war on 8 March 1942 and held on Java by the Japanese occupying forces.

An Honorary Chaplain to the King then Queen, he was Dean of Jersey from 1959 to 1970.

Notes and references

1902 births
1975 deaths
People educated at Manchester Grammar School
Alumni of The Queen's College, Oxford
Honorary Chaplains to the Queen
Companions of the Order of the Bath
Commanders of the Order of the British Empire
Royal Air Force Chaplains-in-Chief
Deans of Jersey
World War II chaplains